Corticaria serrata is a species of minute brown scavenger beetles native to Europe.

References

Latridiidae
Beetles described in 1798
Beetles of Europe